The VTech PreComputer 2000 (also known as the Genius Leader 2000/2000 Plus) is an electronic learning aid manufactured by VTech and released in 1992. It contains a dot matrix LCD, standard size keyboard, 34 activities for teaching in 4 different levels for 1 or 2 players and introductory computer programming with the BASIC programming language. It has an 80,000 word spell checker and a SAT word builder. It can be powered by battery or AC adapter.  It is the successor to the VTech PreComputer 1000 model.

Specifications 
The VTech PreComputer 2000 relies upon a Z80B clone as its processing core.

A 1MBit (128Kbyte) ROM contains the Operating system and program data which can be expanded via the cartridge slot.

Output is supplied by a 2 row 20 column dot-matrix LCD panel.

This machine features a rudimentary implementation of BASIC offering truth tables, arrays, input statements and variables, allowing users to create simple text programs. One program may be held in memory at a time.

Features 
The VTech PreComputer 2000 offers the following features:

 12 educational word activities
 4 mathematics activities
 4 word-based games
 1,000 trivia questions in 4 categories
 1,000 word vocabulary available for activities
 80,000 word spell checker
 BASIC (stylized as PC2000 BASIC)
 Calculator
 Cartridge slot backward compatibility with the VTech PreComputer 1000

Expansion cartridges 
Cartridges for the VTech PreComputer 1000 could be used but the following cartridges were available for the VTech PreComputer 2000: The cartridges could only be inserted with the power off before re-powering and pressing the 'Cartridge' button to activate.

 Super Memory Expander (Stock Code: 80-1531)  - 32Kbyte memory upgrade for BASIC programs
 Famous places and things (Stock Code: 801533) - Marketed for both PreComputer 1000 and 2000

References

External links
 20th Century Retro Games entry (Gallery page for VTech models 1000, 1000 jr, 2000, ProScreen and Variety)

PreComputer 2000